Kosmos 119 ( meaning Cosmos 119), also known as DS-U2-I No.1, was a Soviet satellite which was launched in 1966 as part of the Dnepropetrovsk Sputnik programme. It was a  spacecraft, which was built by the Yuzhnoye Design Bureau, and was used to study the effects on radio waves of passing through the ionosphere.

A Kosmos-2I 63SM carrier rocket was used to launch Kosmos 119 into low Earth orbit. The launch took place from Site 86/1 at Kapustin Yar. The launch occurred at 05:30:59 GMT on 24 May 1966, and resulted in the successful insertion of the satellite into orbit. Upon reaching orbit, the satellite was assigned its Kosmos designation, and received the International Designator 1966-043A. The North American Air Defense Command assigned it the catalogue number 02182.

Kosmos 119 was the first of three DS-U2-I satellites to be launched. On 30 November 1966, it decayed from orbit and reentered the atmosphere.

See also

 1966 in spaceflight

References

Spacecraft launched in 1966
Kosmos satellites
1966 in the Soviet Union
Dnepropetrovsk Sputnik program